Mother of a Different Kind (不一樣的媽媽) is a 1995 Hong Kong film directed by David Chiang.

Cast and roles
 Lau Ching Wan - Supt Cheung Hung
 Fung Bo Bo - Nurse Lam Sau Mei
 Veronica Yip - Jojo
 Annabelle Lau - Mable, WPC10188
 Michael Tong - Shun, PC10249
 Tam Suk Mooi - Pui
 Tang Chi Lin	
 Joe Cheung	
 Man Sing
 Ma Suk Jan

External links
 IMDb entry
 HK cinemagic entry

Hong Kong comedy-drama films
1995 films
Films directed by David Chiang
1990s Hong Kong films